Song of Time may refer to

Song of Time, novel by Ian R. MacLeod 
Song of Time, album by jazz trumpeter Ahmed Abdullah 2004